Kerby is a former settlement in Plumas County, California. It lay at an elevation of 4895 feet (1492 m).

References

Former populated places in California
Former settlements in Plumas County, California